Gambeya is a genus of flowering plants belonging to the family Sapotaceae.

Its native range is Tropical Africa. It is found in the countries of Angola, Benin, Burundi, Cabinda, Cameroon, Central African Republic, Chad, Republic of the Congo, Democratic Republic of the Congo, Equatorial Guinea, Gabon, Ghana, Guinea, the Gulf of Guinea Islands, Ivory Coast, Kenya, Liberia, Madagascar, Malawi, Mozambique, Nigeria, Rwanda, Sierra Leone, Sudan, Tanzania, Uganda, Zambia, and Zimbabwe.

The genus of Gambeya was named in honour of Henri Gambey (1787–1847), French mechanic and entrepreneur who made precision instruments (sextants, compasses, etc.) for many scientists. It was first described and published in Notes Bot. Sapot. on page 61 in 1891.

Species
Known species, according to Kew:

Gambeya africana  – western and central Africa
Gambeya albida  - western and central Africa to Kenya and Tanzania
Gambeya azaguieana  – Liberia, Côte d'Ivoire, and Ghana
Gambeya beguei  – Côte d'Ivoire and central Africa
Gambeya boiviniana  – Madagascar and Comoro Islands
Gambeya boukokoensis  – central Africa
Gambeya gigantea  – western and west-central Africa
Gambeya gorungosana  – Afromontane eastern and southeastern Africa, Angola, Gabon, and Cameroon
Gambeya korupensis  – Cameroon
Gambeya lacourtiana  – west-central Africa
Gambeya lungi  – Republic of the Congo and Democratic Republic of the Congo
Gambeya muerensis  – South Sudan, Uganda, and eastern Democratic Republic of the Congo
Gambeya perpulchra  – west and central Africa to Uganda and Tanzania
Gambeya prunifolia  – Nigeria and Bioko
Gambeya subnuda  – western and central Africa to Uganda
Gambeya taiensis  – Côte d'Ivoire

References

Chrysophylloideae
Sapotaceae genera
Plants described in 1891
Flora of East Tropical Africa
Flora of South Tropical Africa
Flora of West Tropical Africa
Afrotropical realm flora